Harry Marshall Allen (January 26, 1889 – September 13, 1963) was a Canadian politician who was a Member of Provincial Parliament in Legislative Assembly of Ontario from 1945 to 1963. He represented the riding of Middlesex South for the Progressive Conservative Party of Ontario.

Born in Lambeth, Ontario, he was a farmer and lumberman. He died in office in 1963 of a heart attack.

References

External links 

1889 births
1963 deaths
Progressive Conservative Party of Ontario MPPs